Kalan Haywood II (born June 5, 1999) is an American politician serving as a member of the Wisconsin State Assembly.  He represents Wisconsin's 16th Assembly district, comprising areas of downtown Milwaukee. Born in 1999, Haywood is the youngest person serving in the Wisconsin Assembly and one of the youngest legislators in America.

Early life and education 
Haywood was born on June 5, 1999, in Milwaukee, Wisconsin. He graduated from the Rufus King International High School and is currently attending Cardinal Stritch University to earn a Bachelor of Arts degree in Business Administration.

Haywood's father, Kalan Haywood Sr., is the founder of a real estate development firm and an influential man in Milwaukee.

Career 
Haywood served as president of the City of Milwaukee Youth Council. He also worked as a non-profit consultant and was a member of the City of Milwaukee Restorative Justice Advisory Committee.

Haywood was 19 years old when he won the Democratic primary election in August 2018 and the general election in November 2018, making him the youngest person serving in the Wisconsin Assembly and one of the youngest legislators in America.

In the Fall of 2021, Haywood was elected by the Assembly Democratic caucus as their new assistant minority leader, following the resignation of the previous leadership team.

References

External links
 
 
 Representative Kalan Haywood at Wisconsin Legislature
 Official website
 16th Assembly District map (2011–2021)

Living people
1999 births
African-American state legislators in Wisconsin
Democratic Party members of the Wisconsin State Assembly
21st-century American politicians
Politicians from Milwaukee
Rufus King International High School alumni
21st-century African-American politicians